The Maui parrotbill or kiwikiu (Pseudonestor xanthophrys) is a species of  Hawaiian honeycreeper endemic to the island of Maui in Hawaii. This species is critically endangered, with an estimated population in 2016 of 250-540 individuals, but more recent estimates of less than 150 individuals.

Description

The bird is yellow on the breast, cheeks, and belly, olive-green on the wings, crown, tail, and back, and has a bright yellow supercilium. The upper mandible of the bird's beak is hooked and dark gray, while the lower mandible is chisel-like and pale ivory. Males are longer-winged, larger-billed, and heavier than females. Juveniles are gray-green above and light gray ventrally.

Song
Its call is a short “chip”, which is similar to the Maui Nui alauahio, chirped every three to five seconds. It song consists of “cheer” notes that are slower and richer than the ākepa. It also has a short song that sounds like “cheer-wee”.

Diet
The Maui parrotbill is an insectivore. It uses its large beak and powerful jaw muscles to remove bark and wood from small trees and shrubs such as ākala (Rubus hawaiensis), kanawao (Broussaisia arguta), and ōhia lehua (Metrosideros polymorpha), eating the insects underneath. The Maui parrotbill also bites open fruits in search of insects. It is fond of moth pupae and beetle larvae.

Breeding
The Maui parrotbill is monogamous and breeds between November and June. Pairs raise a single nestling per season. The female incubates it for 16 days. Fledglings remain with their parents for five to eight months as they learn how to forage.

Habitat and Distribution
The Maui parrotbill currently lives only in undisturbed wet forests dominated by ōhia lehua (Metrosideros polymorpha) and small patches of ōhia-koa (Acacia koa) mesic forest.

Hawaiian name
As far as anyone can determine, Pseudonestor xanthophrys had not historically had a common name in the Hawaiian language.  The Hawaiian name kiwikiu was developed by the Hawaiian Lexicon Committee, who was contacted by the Maui Forest Bird Recovery Project to select an appropriate name.  A naming ceremony was held in the bird's habitat in September 2010.  The "kiwi" part of the name means bent or curved (e.g., sickle-shaped), which refers to the shape of the bill of this bird.  "Kiu" has a double meaning, referring both to the bird's secretive ways and to a cold, chilly wind, such as the breezes in the bird's habitat.

Conservation

The Maui parrotbill's natural habitat is mesic and wet forests. It is threatened by habitat loss. Much of the land in the parrotbill's historic range was changed for agricultural purposes, timber production and animal grazing. Introduced pests, such as mosquitoes, rats, and feral ungulates directly and indirectly affect the parrotbill's survival. Mosquitoes spread avian malaria, which the parrotbill is susceptible to, rats prey upon the birds' eggs and young, and feral pigs uproot the low-lying vegetation that the parrotbill forages in. Pigs additionally create wallows, which serve as breeding grounds for avian malaria-infected mosquitoes.

The Maui parrotbill was listed as an endangered species in 1967 under the Endangered Species Act. It is also part of the Maui-Molokai Bird Recovery Plan in 1984, which led to fencing areas of East Maui and removing feral ungulates. The recovery plan also included a captive breeding program, which produced its first chick in 2003.  Field research is primarily done by the Maui Forest Bird Recovery Project.

A 2009 survey of the Waikamoi Preserve estimated that there were about 20 birds per square kilometer in the windward preserve near the summit of Haleakala, indicating that the population was holding steady or possibly increasing. A contributing factor is that native shrub cover in Waikamoi has tripled in the past 15 years. A previous study found about half the density. The preserve contains about 25 percent of the population, while most of the rest is in the Hanawi Natural Area Reserve. The birds were once found throughout Maui and Molokai. However, more recent studies have found that the population in fact dramatically declined after 2001, as climate change has made more of the higher-elevation forests that the kiwikiu inhabits more hospitable to mosquitoes. A translocation effort to a restored area on the leeward slopes of Haleakalā in 2019 failed after most birds succumbed to avian malaria, despite otherwise doing well in the habitat. 

It has been predicted that if the mosquito population continues increasing, Maui parrotbills may face functional extinction in the wild by 2027. Due to this, there have been several conservation efforts planned by the Maui Forest Bird Working Group, including at least temporarily fostering a sizeable captive population on zoos in the mainland United States (previous ex-situ conservation efforts were limited to only Hawaii), including potentially the National Aviary in Pennsylvania, Smithsonian Conservation Biology Institute in Virginia and the Tracy Aviary in Utah, potentially introduce a wild population to the island of Hawaii as a backup, manage and restore more habitat in Maui for eventual release, develop predator control tools, and perform landscape-scale mosquito control in the bird's native habitat. The captive population will consist of 15 male and 15 female wild birds; removing such a large number of birds from an already-small wild population may accelerate the timeline of the species' possible extinction in the wild, but it can allow for a safe population to be bred in captivity away from avian malaria.

References

External links
BirdLife Species Factsheet.

Maui Parrotbill videos, photos and sounds on the Internet Bird Collection

Maui parrotbill
Hawaiian honeycreepers
Biota of Maui
Endemic birds of Hawaii
Critically endangered fauna of Hawaii
Maui parrotbill
Taxonomy articles created by Polbot
ESA endangered species
Critically endangered fauna of the United States